Luz de Luna is the fourteenth (14th) studio album by Puerto Rican singer Yolandita Monge. It was released in 1985, and it included the massive hits "Te Veo Pasar (Should Have Known Better)", "El Amor", "Señor...Del Pasado", and "El Poder Del Amor (The Power Of Love)", songs she still performs at her concerts.

This album established Yolandita Monge as one of the most important artist of Puerto Rico in the 80s and one of the greatest of all time among female voices in Latin America. Though her talent was recognized from the beginning, this is the album that launched her super stardom, bringing countless opportunities around the world.  With this production, Yolandita Monge debuted with a sold out concert at the Centro de Bellas Artes of Puerto Rico.

Monge co-wrote the track "Señor...Del Pasado" with Puerto Rican singer/songwriter Lou Briel.  They also translated to the Spanish the song "El Poder Del Amor (The Power Love)", a hit for Jennifer Rush, Air Supply, Laura Branigan, and later, Celine Dion.  This album earned gold record status, making Monge the first Puerto Rican artist to have a gold record.

This release is out of print in all formats. Several hits songs appear in various compilations of the singer available as digital downloads at iTunes and Amazon.

Track listing

Credits and personnel

Vocals: Yolandita Monge
Producers: Mariano Pérez, Oscar Gómez
Arrangements: Javier Lozada, José A. Quintano
Drums: Antonio Moreno
Bass: Manolo Toro
Guitars: Rodrigo García, Rafael Martínez
D X Y Prophet One: Javier Lozada
Prophet 5 Emulator: José A. Quintano
Percussion: Henry Díaz
Pianos: Javier Lozada, José A. Quintano, María Ovelar, Amparo Rodríguez, José Flacón, Marianelli
Sax: Tito Duarte

Engineer: Luis Postigo
Assistant: Jorge Gómez García
Photography: Gabriel Suau
Make-up: Raymond Medina
Design: Miguel Cutillas

Notes

Track listing and credits from album cover.
Released in Cassette Format on 1985 (DIC-10379).
Released in CD Format on 1985 (CBS 450416-2/DIDP-10699).

Charts

References

Yolandita Monge albums
1980 albums